The 10th International Emmy Awards took place on November 22, 1982, in New York City. The award ceremony, presented by the International Academy of Television Arts and Sciences (IATAS), honors all programming produced and originally aired outside the United States.

Ceremony
Television programs representing 50 television networks from 19 countries competed for the 1982 International Emmys. The ceremony was presented by the International Academy of Television Arts and Sciences (IATAS). In addition to the programming awards, the International Academy awarded Japan's Akio Morita the Emmy Directorate Award, and Michael Landon the Emmy Founders Award.

Winners

Best Drama 
  A Voyage Round My Father (United Kingdom: Thames Television)

Best Documentary 
 Is There One Who Understands Me?: The World of James Joyce (Ireland: Raidió Teilifís Éireann)

Best Performing Arts 
  Morte e Vida Severina (Brazil: TV Globo)

Best Popular Arts Program 
  Alexei Sayle's Stuff (United Kingdom: BBC)

References 

International Emmy Awards ceremonies
International
International